The Scotland national football team represents Scotland in international association football and is controlled by the Scottish Football Association.  It is the joint-oldest national football team in the world, alongside England, Scotland's opponents in what is now recognised as the world's first international football match, which took place at Hamilton Crescent in Glasgow in November 1872.

Between the resumption of international football after the First World War in 1920 and the start of the Second World War in 1939, Scotland played 75 international matches, resulting in 46 victories, 12 draws and 17 defeats. Each year Scotland played in the British Home Championship, a round-robin tournament also involving England, Wales and Ireland. Of the 20 tournaments played during this period, Scotland won 7 outright and 4 jointly. One of Scotland's most famous victories came in 1928, when the Wembley Wizards defeated their rivals England 5–1. The team drew large crowds, with the home matches against England in 1931, 1933 and 1937 all setting world record attendances. The match in April 1937 recorded an official attendance of 149,415, which still stands as the record attendance for a European international match.

Scotland started to play matches against opposition from beyond the British Isles between the wars, playing ad-hoc friendly matches against Austria, Czechoslovakia, France, Germany, Hungary, Italy, the Netherlands, Norway and Switzerland. The first FIFA World Cup was played in 1930, but none of the Home Nations, including Scotland, participated in the tournament before the Second World War. This was because their associations had been excluded from FIFA due to a disagreement regarding the status of amateur players. The four associations, including Scotland, returned to the FIFA fold after the Second World War.

Key 

Key to matches
Att. = Match attendance
(H) = Home ground
(A) = Away ground

Key to record by opponent
P = Games played
W = Games won
D = Games drawn
L = Games lost
GF = Goals for
GA = Goals against

Results
Scotland's score is shown first in each case.

Record by opponent

British Home Championship record

References

External links 
 Scottish Football Association: National Team Archive

1920s in Scotland
1930s in Scotland
1900-1939
1919–20 in Scottish football
1920–21 in Scottish football
1921–22 in Scottish football
1922–23 in Scottish football
1923–24 in Scottish football
1924–25 in Scottish football
1925–26 in Scottish football
1926–27 in Scottish football
1927–28 in Scottish football
1928–29 in Scottish football
1929–30 in Scottish football
1930–31 in Scottish football
1931–32 in Scottish football
1932–33 in Scottish football
1933–34 in Scottish football
1934–35 in Scottish football
1935–36 in Scottish football
1936–37 in Scottish football
1937–38 in Scottish football
1938–39 in Scottish football